Adam Harris (born July 21, 1987) is an American sprinter who represented Guyana in the 2008 Summer Olympics, 2009 World Championships, 2013 World Championships and 2014 World Indoor Championships.

He competed in the 200 metres event at the 2008 Olympic Games, but without reaching the final round.

His personal best time is 20.60 seconds, achieved in July 2013 in Morelia, Mexico. Harris is also the Guyanese National Record Holder in the 100 metres and 60 metres dashes. He has 9.90 seconds (wind-aided)/10.09 seconds (wind-legal) in the 100 metres, and 6.55 seconds in the 60 metres, achieved in February 2014 at the Kelly Family Sports Center in Allendale on the campus of Grand Valley State University.

Harris grew up in Wheaton, Illinois, and attended Wheaton North High School, where he was coached by track and field specialist Don Helberg. After graduating he attended The University of Michigan.

Personal bests

Outdoor
100 m: 10.12 s (wind: +0.4 m/s) –  Port of Spain, 17 May 2014
200 m: 20.60 s A (wind: +0.3 m/s) –  Morelia, 7 July 2013
Long jump: 7.32 m (wind: NWI) –  Columbus, Ohio, 5 April 2008

Indoor
60 m: 6.55 s –  Allendale, Michigan, 21 February 2014
200 m: 20.99 s –  State College, Pennsylvania, 1 March 2009
Long jump: 7.58 m –  Madison, Wisconsin, 1 March 2008

Achievements

References

External links
 
 
 
 
 Tilastopaja biography 

1987 births
Living people
Guyanese male sprinters
Athletes (track and field) at the 2008 Summer Olympics
Olympic athletes of Guyana
Sportspeople from Wheaton, Illinois
American sportspeople of Guyanese descent
Athletes (track and field) at the 2010 Commonwealth Games
Athletes (track and field) at the 2014 Commonwealth Games
Commonwealth Games competitors for Guyana
Athletes (track and field) at the 2011 Pan American Games
Athletes (track and field) at the 2015 Pan American Games
Pan American Games competitors for Guyana
Michigan Wolverines men's track and field athletes